Adam Petrouš (born 19 September 1977 in Prague, Czechoslovakia) is a Czech former professional football player. He won four caps for the Czech Republic national football team.

References

External links
 
 

1977 births
Living people
Association football defenders
Czech footballers
Czech Republic youth international footballers
Czech Republic under-21 international footballers
Czech Republic international footballers
Czech expatriate footballers
Footballers at the 2000 Summer Olympics
Olympic footballers of the Czech Republic
FC Slovan Liberec players
SK Slavia Prague players
AC Sparta Prague players
FC Erzgebirge Aue players
FK Austria Wien players
FC Admira Wacker Mödling players
Ankaraspor footballers
FC Rubin Kazan players
FK Viktoria Žižkov players
Expatriate footballers in Germany
Expatriate footballers in Russia
Expatriate footballers in Turkey
Expatriate footballers in Austria
Russian Premier League players
Czech First League players
Austrian Football Bundesliga players
Süper Lig players
2. Bundesliga players
Footballers from Prague